F.J. McLain State Park is a  public recreation area on the Keweenaw Peninsula in Houghton County, Michigan. The state park is located on M-203 halfway between Hancock and Calumet. The park's offshore sights include sunsets over Lake Superior and the art deco–style Keweenaw Waterway Upper Entrance Light.

History
The park is named after Houghton County Commissioner Frederick J. McLain, an instrumental figure in securing land for the site in the 1930s. Laborers working through the Work Projects Administration (WPA) performed most of the park's construction. A new entrance and contact station were built in 1965, following the relocation of M-203.

Activities and amenities
While the majority of the shoreline is rocky, a stretch known as "the Breakwaters" near the Keweenaw Waterway at the park's southern end provides a sandy beach for swimming. The park also offers fishing, picnicking, hiking and cross-country skiing trails, camping, and cabins.

During the first week of the fall semester, Michigan Technological University cancels afternoon classes to allow students and faculty to hold "K-Day" (or "Keweenaw Day") a registered student organization fair. From 1976 to 2017 this fair was held at Mclain State Park. This halted after severe weather damage in June 2018. "K-Day" has been held at Chassell Centennial Park in Chassell, MI since with the exception of 2020 because of COVID precautions.

The spelling of the park's name is inconsistent on roadsigns and in local publications, varying between "McLain", "MacLain", and "McClain", and is often referred to by locals as "McLain's."

References

External links 

McLain State Park Michigan Department of Natural Resources
McLain State Park Map Michigan Department of Natural Resources

State parks of Michigan
Protected areas of Houghton County, Michigan
Beaches of Michigan
Landforms of Houghton County, Michigan
Protected areas established in 1930
1930 establishments in Michigan
IUCN Category III
Works Progress Administration in Michigan